Scottsbluff, Nebraska is a center of media in the Nebraska Panhandle. The following is a list of media outlets in the city.

Print

Newspapers
The Scottsbluff Star Herald is the city's primary newspaper, published six days a week. In addition, News Media Corporation publishes the Business Farmer, a weekly agribusiness paper.

The Scottsbluff Republican was a major newspaper published in Scottsbluff from 1900–1964.

Radio
The following is a list of radio stations licensed to and/or broadcasting from Scottsbluff:

AM

FM

Television
Scottsbluff is located in the Cheyenne, Wyoming television market.

Bridgeport and Morill County are located in the Rapid City, South Dakota television market, while the rest of the panhandle are served by Denver.

The following is a list of television stations that broadcast from and/or are licensed to the city.

References

Mass media in Nebraska